Al-Mahmoudia Mosque or the Mosque of Mahmud Pasha is a historic mosque in the city of Cairo, Egypt. It is located at the Salah al-Din Square in the Citadel of Cairo area, in front of Bab al-Azab gate of the citadel. There are Sultan Hassan Mosque and Al-Rifa'i Mosque to the east.

Description
The mosque dates back to the Ottoman era in 1567 during the administration of Mahmud Pasha who is buried in the mosque. The name of the mosque is derived from him. The mosque is attached with the mausoleum of Mahmud Pasha which is accessible through the door on the mihrab wall. Mahmud Pasha was shot dead near the mosque after being accused of oppressing the Egyptian people. 

The design of the mosque is unique in its architectural style which follows the Mamluk tradition for the main building and partly based on the Ottoman architecture for the minaret in particular. The minaret is decorated with a ring with muqarnas and a cone shaped obelisk on top. It is noted to be smaller than the other mosques in the same area, and it is partly due to the building was built on top of the pile of stones, and it is required to climb up stairs to the mosque. The mosque has four sides, and two of them have entrance gate on it. The gates are ornamented with two lines of windows filled with plasters and maroon glass works, with muqarnas on top of them facing toward the balconies.

Condition
The mosque was restored by Farouk I in 1940. The restoration reinforced the vaults and fixed the ceiling.

In 2015, the Ministry of Antiquity reported that the minaret of the mosque is in danger of collapsing any moment if there’s no adequate measure to be implemented. The picture released by the Youm 7 paper showed the cracks on the wall behind the minaret.

See also
  Lists of mosques 
  List of mosques in Africa
  List of mosques in Egypt

References

Bibliography

Bates, Ülkü. "Façades in Ottoman Cairo." In The Ottoman City and Its Parts, edited by Irene Bierman, Rifa’at Abou-El-Haj, and Donald Preziosi, 129-172. New Rochelle, N.Y. : A.D. Caratzas, 1991. 
Behrens-Abouseif, Doris. Islamic Architecture in Cairo. Leiden: E. J. Brill, 1989. 
Jarrar, Sabri, András Riedlmayer, and Jeffrey B. Spurr. Resources for the Study of Islamic Architecture. Cambridge, MA: Aga Khan Program for Islamic Architecture, 1994.

Mosques completed in the 1560s
Mamluk architecture in Egypt
Ottoman mosques in Egypt
Mosque buildings with domes
Mosques in Cairo
1567 establishments in the Ottoman Empire